Miranda Rae Mayo  is an American television actress. She starred as Lacey Briggs on Blood & Oil (2015) and has appeared on Chicago Fire as Lieutenant Stella Kidd since 2016.

Life and career 
Mayo was born in Fresno, California and began her acting career appearing in the local stage productions and at her high school Roosevelt High School. She relocated to Los Angeles and began a modeling career before making her television debut. In 2011, Mayo guest-starred in an episode of the short-lived NBC police series, Law & Order: LA.

In 2013, she had a recurring role in the BET comedy series The Game. The following year she joined the cast of Days of Our Lives as Zoe Browning. She appeared on the show on a recurring basis from August 2014 to July 2015. In early 2015, Mayo had the recurring role as Talia Sandoval during the fifth season of the Freeform teen drama series Pretty Little Liars.

In 2015 she appeared in the second season of HBO anthology crime series True Detective, and was cast in the recurring role of the Showtime drama series The Affair as the new love interest of Joshua Jackson's character's. In the same year, Mayo was cast in the series regular role in the ABC prime time soap opera Blood & Oil as Lacey Briggs, the daughter of oil tycoon Hap Briggs (Don Johnson).

In 2016, she joined the cast of Chicago Fire playing Stella Kidd, a new firefighter.

Filmography

Film

Television

References

External links 
 
 
 Next Interview w/ Miranda Rae Mayo I June 28th 2013 I Black Hollywood Live Youtube.com

Actresses from Fresno, California
Female models from California
American television actresses
American soap opera actresses
Living people
21st-century American actresses
Year of birth missing (living people)